Deke may refer to:

People
 Deke Anderson, actor
 Deke Cooper, football player
 Deke Leonard, musician
 Deke Sharon, singer, musician, producer
 Deke Slayton, one of the original seven Mercury astronauts
 Dikembe Mutombo, basketball player

Other uses
 Deke (ice hockey), a technique used to move past an opponent
 Delta Kappa Epsilon, a college fraternity
 Deke, a character in the video game Fire Emblem: The Binding Blade
 Deke Rivers, Elvis Presley's character in the film Loving You (1957 film)